Brenden Lee Sander (born December 22, 1995) is an American volleyball player. He is a former member of the United States men's national volleyball team and on club leven he competes for  Greek powerhouse Panathinaikos.

His older brother Taylor Sander is also a volleyball player, who was a member United States men's national volleyball team.

Sporting achievements

College
 National championships
 2016  NCAA national championship
 2017  NCAA national championship

Clubs
 FIVB Club World Championship
  Poland 2018 – with Cucine Lube Civitanova

Youth national team
 2014  U21 NORCECA Championship
 2015  U21 Pan American Cup

Personal life
In 2022, Sander married former women's national team player Paige Tapp.

References

External links
 Player profile at CEV.eu
 Player profile at PlusLiga.pl
 player profile at LegaVolley.it
 Player profile at BYUCougars.com
 Player profile at Volleybox.net

1995 births
Living people
Sportspeople from Huntington Beach, California
American men's volleyball players
American expatriate sportspeople in Italy
Expatriate volleyball players in Italy
American expatriate sportspeople in Poland
Expatriate volleyball players in Poland
Czarni Radom players
BYU Cougars men's volleyball players
Panathinaikos V.C. players